The Isle of Man Ambulance Service is a sub-division of the Department of Health and Social Care.

The Isle of Man has ten ambulances and ten paramedic cars; operating from three bases: Douglas (Ambulance Service HQ at Noble’s Hospital), Ramsey (Ramsey Cottage Hospital) and Castletown and Malew combined fire and ambulance Station. There are four operational ambulances on duty during the day, and three overnight, supported by a paramedic duty officer.

References

External links
 

Ambulance services in the United Kingdom
Cottage hospitals
Health in the Isle of Man
Emergency services in the Isle of Man